Borage ( or ; Borago officinalis), also known as starflower, is an annual herb in the flowering plant family Boraginaceae. It is native to the Mediterranean region, and has naturalized in many other locales. 

It grows satisfactorily in gardens in most of Europe, such as Denmark, France, Germany, and the United Kingdom, remaining in the garden from year to year by self-seeding. The leaves are edible and the plant is grown in gardens for that purpose in some parts of Europe.

The plant is also commercially cultivated for borage seed oil extracted from its seeds. 

The plant contains pyrrolizidine alkaloids, some of which are hepatotoxic, mutagenic, and carcinogenic (see below under Phytochemistry).

Description

The flowers are complete, perfect with five narrow, triangular-pointed petals. Flowers are most often blue, although pink flowers are sometimes observed. White-flowered types are also cultivated. The blue flower is genetically dominant over the white flower. 

The flowers arise along scorpioid cymes to form large floral displays with multiple flowers blooming simultaneously, suggesting that borage has a high degree of geitonogamy (intraplant pollination). 

It has an indeterminate growth habit, which may lead to prolific spreading. In temperate climates such as in the UK, its flowering season is relatively long, from June to September. In milder climates, borage blooms continuously for most of the year.

Characteristics and uses 

Traditionally, borage was cultivated for culinary and medicinal uses, although today, commercial cultivation is mainly as an oilseed.
 
Borage is used as either a fresh vegetable or a dried herb. As a fresh vegetable, borage, with a cucumber-like taste, is often used in salads or as a garnish. 

The flower has a sweet, honey-like taste and is often used to decorate desserts and cocktails, most commonly, frozen in ice cubes.

Food
Vegetable use of borage is common in Germany, in the Spanish regions of Aragón and Navarre, on the Greek island of Crete, and in the northern Italian region of Liguria. 

Although often used in soups, one of the better known German borage recipes is the Frankfurt speciality grüne Soße ("green sauce"). 

In Liguria, Italy, borage (in Italian, borragine) is commonly used as a filling of the traditional pasta ravioli and pansoti. 

It is used to flavour pickled gherkins in Poland and Russia. 

The flowers produce copious nectar which is used by honeybees to make a light and delicate honey.

Beverage  
Borage is traditionally used as a garnish in the Pimms Cup cocktail, but is nowadays often replaced by a long sliver of cucumber peel or by  mint. It is also one of the key botanicals in Gilpin's Westmorland Extra Dry Gin.

In Persian cuisine, borage tea (using the dried purple flowers) is called گل گاوزبان : gol gâvzabân, "cow's-tongue-flower".

Phytochemistry 

The seeds contain 26–38% of borage seed oil, of which 17–28% is gamma-linolenic acid (GLA, an Omega-6 oil), the richest known source. 

The oil also contains the fatty acids palmitic acid (10–11%), stearic acid (3.5–4.5%), oleic acid (16–20%), linoleic acid (35–38%), eicosenoic acid (3.5–5.5%), erucic acid (1.5–3.5%), and nervonic acid (1.5%). 

The oil is often marketed as "starflower oil" or "borage oil" for use as a GLA supplement, although healthy adults typically produce ample GLA from dietary linoleic acid.

The leaves contain small amounts (2–10 ppm of dried herb) of the liver-toxic pyrrolizidine alkaloids (PA) intermedine, lycopsamine, amabiline, and supinine and the nontoxic saturated PA thesinine.  PAs are also present in borage seed oil, but may be removed by processing. 

The German Federal Institute for Risk Assessment has advised that honey from borage contains PAs, transferred to the honey through pollen collected at borage plants, and advise that commercial honey production could select for raw honey with limited PA content to prevent contamination.

Herbal medicine

Traditionally, Borago officinalis has been used in hyperactive gastrointestinal, respiratory and cardiovascular disorders, such as gastrointestinal (colic, cramps, diarrhea), airways (asthma, bronchitis), cardiovascular, (cardiotonic, antihypertensive and blood purifier), urinary (diuretic and kidney/bladder disorders).

One case of status epilepticus has been reported that was associated with borage oil ingestion.

A methanol extract of borage has shown strong amoebicidal activity in vitro. The 50% inhibitory concentration of the extract against Entamoeba histolytica was 33 µg/mLl.

In history
Pliny the Elder and Dioscorides said that borage was the nepenthe (νηπενθές : nēpenthés) mentioned in Homer, which caused forgetfulness when mixed with wine.

Francis Bacon  thought that borage had "an excellent spirit to repress the fuliginous vapour of dusky melancholie." 

John Gerard's Herball mentions an old verse concerning the plant: "Ego Borago, Gaudia semper ago (I, Borage, bring always joys)". He asserts:

Companion planting
Borage is used in companion planting. It is said to protect or nurse legumes, spinach, brassicas, and even strawberries. It is also said to be a good companion plant to tomatoes because it confuses the mother moths of tomato hornworms or manduca looking for a place to lay their eggs. Claims that it improves tomato growth and makes them taste better remain unsubstantiated.

See also
 List of companion plants

References

External links
https://persianmama.com/chai-gol-gavzaban-brewed-borage-tea/

https://www.pinterest.ca/pin/557179785128125722/
 
 

Boraginoideae
Herbs
Leaf vegetables
Medicinal plants of Asia
Flora of Europe
Edible plants